Turbulence is a 1997 American action thriller film directed by Robert Butler, and starring Ray Liotta and Lauren Holly. It was distributed by MGM Distribution Co.

Plot
Ryan Weaver, also known as the Lonely Hearts Strangler, an accused serial killer and rapist, is arrested in New York City despite his claims of innocence. Even though police lieutenant Aldo Hines at one point broke protocol during the arrest (which later enraged Weaver), the authorities have enough hard evidence to have Weaver transported to Los Angeles to face trial. He and another prisoner, a bank robber named Stubbs, are escorted by four US marshals on a Boeing 747-200 on a commercial flight. Even though it is Christmas Eve, the 747 is nearly empty, with only eleven people on board.

During the flight, Stubbs breaks free while using the bathroom and begins a shootout with the marshals. A stray bullet fired from one of the marshals' sidearms punches a hole in the fuselage, instantly triggering an explosive decompression before the hole is sealed with a briefcase. Amidst the chaos, the captain is fatally shot and the first officer dies when his head slams into the yoke, disengaging the autopilot in the process. Weaver frees himself and attempts to save the last remaining marshal, but fails when Stubbs shoots the marshal dead, after being shot himself.

Weaver appears to be horrified by the ordeal, increasing the passengers' trust in him. With the pilots dead, Teri Halloran, a flight attendant, makes her way into the cockpit and learns she is the only one left capable of keeping the 747 from crashing. To make matters worse, the plane is heading into a storm which threatens severe turbulence.

Weaver's behavior becomes increasingly erratic since he is paranoid of being sentenced to death upon landing and occasionally suffers nervous breakdowns. He then locks the passengers in the crew's cabin then attacks and strangles Maggie, one of the other flight attendants, to death. Ryan reveals that he did in fact commit the murders that he's accused of, although he continues to insist that the evidence against him was planted by Hines. He then calls the FBI control center at LAX and threatens to crash the 747 into their facility since he is now willing to do anything to avoid being arrested. His motives had become clear to Teri after she speaks, via the aircraft's radio, with Hines.

Teri must be instructed by radio from Captain Bowen how to reprogram the autopilot to land at LAX, but her task is complicated by Weaver's obscene and constant interruptions. After the plane barely survives turbulence during the storm, Weaver breaks into the avionics bay and smashes the server running the primary autopilot software, rendering the first landing attempt unsuccessful, and forcing a last second go-around. It skims a rooftop Japanese restaurant and a multi-story parking garage, but regains the air. The plane's landing gear picks up a Ford Ranger pickup, which hinders the next landing at LAX. The backup autopilot has now engaged, and Teri makes efforts to turn the plane around. The LAX airport chief sends an F-14 Tomcat to intercept the 747.

Teri begs LAX not to have her shot down, insisting she can land the plane. Weaver breaks into the cockpit with an axe and tries to kill her, but the F-14 destroys the truck instead, shaking the 747 and giving Teri a chance to attack. Teri retrieves a .38 revolver that one of the marshals was forced to unload and turn over to the captain upon boarding, and, in the midst of Weaver's assault, manages to load a bullet that fell out of the marshal's pocket. She finally shoots Weaver through the head and kills him. Teri returns to the pilot's seat and with Bowen's radio assistance, safely lands the 747 using the autopilot. Despite Weaver's claims that he killed them all, the other crew and passengers are found alive.

Cast
 Ray Liotta as Ryan Weaver
 Lauren Holly as Teri Halloran
 Catherine Hicks as Maggie
 Héctor Elizondo as Lieutenant Aldo Hines
 Rachel Ticotin as Rachel Taper
 Brendan Gleeson as Stubbs
 Ben Cross as Captain Samuel Bowen
 Jeffrey DeMunn as Brooks
 John Finn as FBI Special Agent Frank Sinclair 
 Heidi Kling as Betty
 Gordy Owens as Carl
 Michael Harney as Chief Deputy U.S. Marshal Marty Douglas
 Grand Bush as Deputy U.S. Marshal Al Arquette 
 Richard Hoyt-Miller as Deputy U.S. Marshal Riordan 
 Michael Francis Kelly as Deputy U.S. Marshal Green
 J. Kenneth Campbell as Captain Matt Powell
 James MacDonald as 1st Officer Ted Kary
 George Cheung as The Party Guest (uncredited)

Production
The spec script was purchased by Rysher Entertainment for $1 million. The film was announced to be in development in May 1995. The film was part of a four picture distribution deal between Rysher and MGM.

Reception

Box office
Turbulence grossed $11 million domestically on a $55 million budget.

Critical reception
Rotten Tomatoes, a review aggregator, gave it an approval rating of 17% with three positive and 15 negative out of 18 reviews; the average rating was 3.2 out of 10. Audiences polled by CinemaScore gave the film an average grade of "B−" on an A+ to F scale.

Both Roger Ebert and James Berardinelli rated the film one star out of four, denouncing the implausible storyline as well as the casting of Lauren Holly as an action heroine. G. Allen Johnson of the San Francisco Examiner called the film "an absolute bore".

Lauren Holly's performance in the film earned her a Razzie Award nomination for Worst Actress, though she lost to Demi Moore for G.I. Jane. Turbulence was also nominated for Worst Reckless Disregard for Human Life and Public Property but lost to Con Air. At the Stinkers Bad Movie Awards, Holly was nominated for Worst Actress but lost to Alicia Silverstone for Excess Baggage.

Sequels
Despite its box office failure, the film did well enough on home video to become a trilogy with two new direct-to-video sequels. They are Turbulence 2: Fear of Flying and Turbulence 3: Heavy Metal, each with a different cast.

References

External links
 
 
 

1997 films
1997 crime thriller films
1990s disaster films
American aviation films
American action thriller films
American crime thriller films
American disaster films
1990s English-language films
Films about aviation accidents or incidents
Films about murderers
Films about aircraft hijackings
Films set on airplanes
Films shot in California
Films shot in New Jersey
Films shot in New York City
Metro-Goldwyn-Mayer films
Rysher Entertainment films
Films scored by Shirley Walker
Films directed by Robert Butler
Films produced by David Valdes
1990s American films